Disability culture is a widely used concept developed in the late 1980s to capture differences in lifestyle that are caused or promoted by disability. Disability cultures exist as communities of people around topics of disability. The cultures include arts movements, coalitions, and include but are not limited to: poetry, dance, performance pieces, installments, and sculptures.  Steven Brown, in an academic study, wrote, "The existence of a disability culture is a relatively new and contested idea. Not surprising, perhaps, for a group that has long been described with terms like 'in-valid', 'impaired', 'limited', 'crippled', and so forth. Scholars would be hard-pressed to discover terms of hope, endearment or ability associated with people with disabilities." Deaf culture has an older history, having been described in 1965, and Deaf culture can be connected to the larger disability culture, both due to deafness being viewed by others as a disability, and many deaf people being both Deaf and disabled in other ways, which is known as being Deaf plus.

Disability culture cannot be defined by one specific description or language. It is a complex blending of art, performance, expression, and community. Within this culture, the word "disabled" has been re-purposed to represent a social identity of empowerment and awareness. Like many civil rights movements in the past, disability culture challenges the norms of society, and seeks to counter oppressive entities such as medicalization and institutionalization. Its core values as a culture are reflected in art, conversation, goals, or behaviors. These core values often include: "an acceptance of human differences, an acceptance of human vulnerability and interdependence, a tolerance for a lack of resolution of the unpredictable in life, and a humor to laugh at the oppressor or situation, however dire it may be".

"The elements of our culture include, certainly, our longstanding social oppression, but also our emerging art and humor, our piecing together of our history, our evolving language and symbols, our remarkably unified world view, beliefs and values, and our strategies for surviving and thriving." -Carol Gill Ph.D.

Disability culture is a trajectory, a movement, a path, rather than a destination: "Disability culture is the difference between being alone, isolated, and individuated with a physical, cognitive, emotional or sensory difference that in our society invites discrimination and reinforces that isolation – the difference between all that and being in community. Naming oneself part of a larger group, a social movement or a subject position in modernity can help to focus energy, and to understand that solidarity can be found – precariously, in improvisation, always on the verge of collapse." - Petra Kuppers

"Disability culture, which values interdependence over the illusion of independence, privileges not a uniform perspective but the validity and value of a wide range of ways of moving through the world - and the varied perspectives those different experiences engender." - Jim Ferris

See also
Disability in the arts
Disability in the media
Disability arts
Disability Flag
Disability rights movement

References